"In the Penny Arcade" is a short story by American writer Steven Millhauser. It is one of seven short stories  previously published in the early 1980s in venues such as the New Yorker, Grand Street, Antaeus, and the  Hudson Review. Like  Millhauser's two novels (Edwin Mulhouse and Portrait of a Romantic), they are about the ability of artists and children to see things anew, to remake things through the force of their own romantic yearnings, and the dangerous consequences of that gift.

Plot summary 
 
The short story begins with a young narrator whom on his twelfth birthday visits an amusement park he has not been to for over two years. He has longed to re-visit the penny arcade “I had dreamed of it all that tense, enigmatic summer…” and when approaching it has his mother and father wait outside.  He steps into darkness and hears the familiar sounds of the penny arcade. He passes older teenagers and strolls past familiar games such as a toy derrick, and pinball machine. But he came for something else, something “mysterious and elusive.” 

He came across an old fortune teller and sees for the first time how the games have aged by her sullen appearance and general deterioration that comes with use. He walks further in to find a cowboy no one was paying attention to, eventually coming to a section of old machines near the back of the arcade. He wandered aimlessly looking for something that would catch his eye until he came upon a section of the arcade roped off and covered with cloths. He becomes excited thinking that they were the machines that enticed him the first time he visited the arcade. 

After believing a mysterious hush came over the arcade he returns to the front approaching the cowboy once more. He plays with a few of the machines and begins to understand the creatures of the arcade, seeing them in a new light. When he leaves the arcade back into the sunshine under the August sky, he is satisfied with his visit.

References

Sources

1986 short stories
American short stories